"Love's Gonna Live Here" is a 1963 single by Buck Owens, who also wrote the song.  The single would be Buck Owens' second number one on the country charts spending sixteen weeks at the top spot and a total of thirty weeks on the chart.

After "Love's Gonna Live Here" finished its 16-week stay at No. 1, no other song would spend more than 10 weeks at No. 1 for 49 years; the closest any song came was  years later, with David Houston's "Almost Persuaded" spending nine weeks at No. 1 from August to October 1966. On January 12, 2013, "We Are Never Ever Getting Back Together" by Taylor Swift would become the first song since "Love's Gonna Live Here" to spend at least 10 weeks at No. 1.

On July 6, 2013, "Cruise" by Florida Georgia Line surpassed the 16-weeks-at-No.-1 longevity of "Love's Gonna Live Here" on the Billboard Hot Country Songs chart when that song logged its 17th week at No. 1, something that had not happened in more than 49 years.

Chart performance

Cover versions 
Sten & Stanley on the 1994 album Musik, dans & party 10 as "Nu leker livet igen".
Waylon Jennings - On the album Waylon at JD's (Sound Limited), released in December 1964
Wanda Jackson - On the album The Happy Side of Wanda Jackson (Capitol), released in 1969
Emmylou Harris - On the album Last Date, released in 1982.
Martina McBride - On the album Timeless (RCA), released on October 10, 2005
The Derailers - On the album Under the Influence of Buck (Palo Duro Records), released on July 31, 2007
Dwight Yoakam - On the album Dwight Sings Buck (New West), released on October 23, 2007
 Tanya Tucker – On the album My Turn, released on June 30, 2009

References 

Buck Owens songs
1963 singles
Songs written by Buck Owens
Song recordings produced by Ken Nelson (American record producer)
Capitol Records singles
Sten & Stanley songs
1963 songs